Daniel Tovar (born August 27, 1989) is a Mexican actor. Tovar is mostly known for his roles as Fito in the sitcom Skimo for all its 4 seasons, and as Alejandro in the award-winning film La Zona. However, his career began in 1999 with the miniseries "Camino a Casa".

Filmography

Theatre

References

External links 

Mexican male film actors
Mexican male telenovela actors
Mexican male television actors
1989 births
Living people
Male actors from Mexico City